Survivors is a 2022 Nigerian comedy movie that was produced by John Esedafe and directed by Kayode Peter and produced by Tunice Entertainment World.

The comedy film was released on 1 July 2022 and it stars  Mr Macaroni,  Broda Shaggi, MC Lively, I Go Save, Chinonso Arubayi, Chris Iheuwa and Tony Akosheri

Synopsis 

The movie revolves around Gideon and Zacchaeus; two road side mechanics on their struggle to become wealthy. They eventually met David, a criminal, who introduced them to the act of kidnapping.

Cast 
 Mr Macaroni
 Broda Shaggi
 MC Lively
 I Go Save
 Chinonso Arubayi
 Chris Iheuwa
 Tony Akosheri

References 

2022 films
Nigerian comedy-drama films
2022 comedy-drama films